Rogelio "Tito" Ramallo Peña (born on 29 April 1969), is a Spanish retired footballer who played as a defender, and is a current manager.

Profile
Born in A Coruña, Ramallo played as a defender for Deportivo de La Coruña during his career extended between 1987 and 1993. After spending a long coaching career at Deportivo de La Coruña B between 2001 and 2012, he managed the Armenian Premier League club FC Banants between October 2015 and October 2016.

In May 2016, he won the 2015–16 Armenian Cup title with his club Banants Yerevan.

Managerial statistics

References

External links

1969 births
Living people
Spanish footballers
Footballers from A Coruña
Association football defenders
Segunda División B players
Tercera División players
Deportivo Fabril players
Spanish football managers
FC Urartu managers
Spanish expatriate football managers
Expatriate football managers in Armenia